Giovanni Colella (born 10 August 1966) is an Italian football manager, in charge of Partizani.

Managerial career
Colella has been manager of a few clubs in lower divisions, mostly in Serie C and Serie D. He has had two spells in Albania, one in charge of Apolonia, and the other at Partizani, club where he's currently manager of, as of February 2023.

Apolonia

In 2020, Giovanni Colella was given a director role at Apolonia, when they were promoted to the Albanian Superliga. However, their current coach at that time, Artan Mërgjyshi, left, and so Colella was promoted as Apolonia's new manager. During his short tenure, Apolonia earned just 2 points in 5 matches, having scored 4 goals and conceded 14. Shortly after, he resigned, and his resignation was soon accepted by the club board.

Partizani

On 10 August 2022, Colella was appointed as manager at Partizani. This was made possible by the club's sporting director, Elton Marini. At first, Partizani won their first three fixtures in the Abissnet Superiore, and even after some bad runs of form, Partizani were in first place. During his tenure, Partizani won against Vllaznia in Shkodër for the first time in 3 years. The last time Partizani had won there was in the 2019–20 season, when they were coached by Colella's compatriot, Franco Lerda. He also led his team to victory against their city rivals, Tirana, for the first time in 1 year and 9 months. However, in 2023, Partizani had another bad run of form, which was a big blow to their objectives.

References

1966 births
People from Salerno
Living people
Italian football managers
L.R. Vicenza managers
Italian expatriate football managers
Expatriate football managers in Albania
Italian expatriate sportspeople in Albania
Kategoria Superiore managers
Serie C managers